The 1912 Chicago Green Sox season was the only season for the Green Sox of the United States Baseball League, a league that folded within a month of its creation. Chicago stood at 6th place by season's end with a 10–12 record.

Regular season

Standings

Roster

References 

Chicago Green Sox seasons